James or Jim O'Neil may refer to:

James A. O'Neil (1800–1874), American businessman and politician
Jim O'Neil (ice hockey) (1913–1997), Canadian professional ice hockey player
Jim O'Neil (American football), American football defensive coordinator 
James O'Neil, American political candidate; see New Hampshire state elections, 2004

See also
James O'Neill (disambiguation)
Jimmy O'Neill (disambiguation)
James O'Neal (disambiguation)
Jim O'Neill (disambiguation)
James Neal (disambiguation)